De Munt is Dutch for the Mint. It can refer to:

De Munt or La Monnaie -  opera house in Brussels
Muntplein (Munt Square), Amsterdam
Munttoren (Munt Tower)
Pathé De Munt movie theater

See also